Frank Butler (4 July 1932 – 30 June 2015) was a South African water polo player. He competed in the men's tournament at the 1960 Summer Olympics.

References

External links
 

1932 births
2015 deaths
South African male water polo players
Olympic water polo players of South Africa
Water polo players at the 1960 Summer Olympics
Sportspeople from Johannesburg